Chambon is a commune in the Cher department in the Centre-Val de Loire region of France.

Geography
The town was a part of the canton of Châteauneuf-sur-Cher; in 2015, following the redistribution of the cantons of the department, it became a part of the canton of Trouy.

Location

Typology 
Chambon is a rural commune. It is a part of the municipalities with little or very little density, within the meaning of the municipal density grid of INSEE.

In addition, the municipality is part of the attraction area of Saint-Amand-Montrond, of which it is a municipality in the crown. This area, which includes 36 municipalities, is categorized into areas with fewer than 50,000 inhabitants.

Land use 
The zoning of the municipality, as reflected in the database European occupation biophysical soil Corine Land Cover (CLC), is marked by the importance of the agricultural land (89.5% in 2018), a proportion roughly equivalent to that of 1990 (89.4%). The detailed breakdown in 2018 is as follows:

 grasslands (46.4%)
 arable land (43.1%)
 forests (10.5%)

Politics and administration

Environmental policy 
In its 2016 winners, the National Council of Flowered Cities and Villages of France awarded one flower to the municipality in Concours des villes et villages fleuris.

Population

Sights

The Church of Saint-Pierre de Chambon has been listed as a historical monument since 1922.

See also
Communes of the Cher department

References

Communes of Cher (department)